Vera Lúcia Montez dos Santos (born 3 December 1981 in Santarém, Lezíria do Tejo) is a Portuguese race walker.

She began racing at the senior international level in 2002, taking part in the 2002 European Athletics Championships. Her first major medal was a silver at the 2003 European Athletics U23 Championships and she went on to compete at that year's World Championships in Athletics. Santos finished 15th at the 2005 World Championships but managed a silver at the 2005 Summer Universiade. She won the bronze at the 2008 IAAF World Race Walking Cup and then went on to finish ninth in a then personal best time at the 2008 Beijing Olympics later that year. She put in the highest-ranking performance at the 2009 World Championships, taking fifth place.

Santos won her first national racewalking title in 2005 and became a two-time national champion in 2010 with a win at the Meeting de Marcha Atlética da Cidade de Olhao. She took another victory on home turf soon after, winning the Grande Premio Internacional en Marcha Atletica in Rio Maior. She led the race throughout, holding off China's Li Yanfei, and after the win she began altitude training to prepare for the upcoming World Race Walking Cup. She took her third circuit win of the year at the Coppa Città di Sesto San Giovanni.  She competed at the 2012 Summer Olympics.

In 2014, she set a new personal best of 1:28:02 at the World Race Walking Cup in Taicang, finishing in 11th place.

Achievements

References

External links

sports-reference

1981 births
Living people
People from Santarém, Portugal
Portuguese female racewalkers
Olympic athletes of Portugal
Athletes (track and field) at the 2008 Summer Olympics
Athletes (track and field) at the 2012 Summer Olympics
World Athletics Championships athletes for Portugal
Universiade medalists in athletics (track and field)
Universiade silver medalists for Portugal
Medalists at the 2005 Summer Universiade
Sportspeople from Santarém District